My Heart is a studio album by the country music artist Lorrie Morgan, released in 1999. It contains two chart singles: "Here I Go Again" (#72) and "Maybe Not Tonight", a duet with Sammy Kershaw (#17). The latter song was also included on Kershaw's 1999 album Maybe Not Tonight. The track "The Only Thing That Looks Good on Me Is You" is a cover of a Bryan Adams song.

Track listing
"The Things We Do" (Brett Jones) – 3:53
duet with Jo Dee Messina
"Where Does That Leave Me?" (Robert Ellis Orrall, Cathy Majeski) – 3:25
"I Did" (Michelle McAfee, Richard Leigh) – 3:49
"Strong Enough to Cry" (Max D. Barnes, Rory Lee Feek) – 4:19
"Maybe Not Tonight" (Keith Stegall, Dan Hill) – 4:09
duet with Sammy Kershaw
"Here I Go Again" (Kim Richey) – 2:56
"Between Midnight and Tomorrow" (Leslie Satcher) – 3:54
"The Only Thing That Looks Good on Me Is You" (Robert John "Mutt" Lange, Bryan Adams) – 3:50
"Never Been Good at Letting Go" (Trey Bruce) – 4:34
"My Heart" (Satcher) – 2:19
"On This Bed" (Jon Randall) – 3:57

Personnel
 Brittany Allyn - background vocals
 Eddie Bayers - drums
 Mike Brignardello - bass guitar
 Sam Bush - mandolin
 Larry Byrom - acoustic guitar
 Vinnie Colaiuta - drums
 Stuart Duncan - fiddle
 Tabitha Fair - background vocals
 Larry Franklin - fiddle
 Paul Franklin - pedal steel guitar
 John Hobbs - organ, piano, synthesizer, Wurlitzer
 Dann Huff - electric guitar
 Carl Jackson - background vocals
 Sammy Kershaw - duet vocals on "Maybe Not Tonight"
 Brent Mason - electric guitar
 Jo Dee Messina - duet vocals on "The Things We Do"
 Lorrie Morgan - lead vocals
 Gary Prim - keyboards
 Brent Rowan - electric guitar
 John Wesley Ryles - background vocals
 Leslie Satcher - background vocals
 John Willis - acoustic guitar
 Glenn Worf - bass guitar

Chart performance

References

1999 albums
BNA Records albums
Lorrie Morgan albums